Aalukkoru Veedu is a 1960 Indian Tamil-language film directed by M. Krishnan and produced by Subhash Movies. The film was written by Sakthi T. K. Krishnasamy. The film stars Sathyan, T. S. Muthaiah, D. Balasubramaniam, L. Vijayalakshmi, Tambaram Lalitha, T. R. Ramachandran and S. D. Subbulakshmi.

Plot

Production 
Aalukkoru Veedu was written by playwright and screenwriter Sakthi T. K. Krishnasamy, produced by the studio Subhash Movies and directed by Malayalam director M. Krishnan. The dance sequences were choreographed by E. Madhavan, while A. Krishnan was the cinematographer. Shooting took place at Vijaya-Vauhini Studios.

Soundtrack 
The music was composed by the duo Viswanathan–Ramamoorthy, and the lyrics were penned by Pattukkottai Kalyanasundaram and K. D. Santhanam. Playback singers were K. Jamuna Rani, Renuka, A. L. Raghavan, K. Rani, L. R. Eswari, P. Leela, P. B. Sreenivas and P. Susheela.

The song "Anbu Manam Kalantha Pinney Acchham Thevayaa", a duet between P. B. Sreenivas and P. Susheela, became a hit.

Reception 
Aalukkoru Veedu was released on 16 September 1960. The film was praised for the performances of its cast, especially that of Sathyan, but was only modestly successful at the box office.

References

External links 
 

1960 drama films
1960 films
1960s Tamil-language films
Films directed by M. Krishnan Nair
Films scored by Viswanathan–Ramamoorthy
Indian drama films